Ding Jinhui is a retired Chinese basketball player.

CBA career
Ding Jinhui signed his first professional contract with Chinese Basketball Association side Zhejiang Golden Bulls in 2006. He averaged 14.5 points per game and 6.1 rebounds per game in the 2006–07 season. He was named as an all-star in the 2009–10 season, playing in the 2010 CBA All-Star Game.

In 2016, due to injuries, Ding announced his retirement at the age of 27.

International career 
Ding was part of the Chinese team that won the 2010 Asian Games and the 2011 FIBA Asian Championship, and took part at the 2012 Olympics.

Career statistics

CBA statistics

References

1990 births
Living people
Asian Games gold medalists for China
Asian Games medalists in basketball
Basketball players at the 2010 Asian Games
Basketball players at the 2012 Summer Olympics
Basketball players from Zhejiang
Chinese men's basketball players
Centers (basketball)
Olympic basketball players of China
People from Lishui
Power forwards (basketball)
Zhejiang Golden Bulls players
Medalists at the 2010 Asian Games
2010 FIBA World Championship players